My Family is a 2000–2011 BBC series.

"My Family" can also refer to:

My Family (film), a 1995 American film directed by Gregory Nava
My Family (Hong Kong TV series), 2005
My Family (Malaysian TV series), 2012
Ma Famille, an Ivorian TV series, 2002–2007
Moya Semia (Моя Семья), Russian product line of beverages, usually associated with juices. Russian franchise of Minute Maid beverages.
 The Family Channel (U.S. TV network), named "My Family TV" between 2009 and 2013